Tunis is a village in Sohag Governorate, Egypt located in the Sohag Markaz. In 2006 it was inhabited by 19 495 people.

Notes

References 

Villages in Egypt
Populated places in Sohag Governorate